Italosiren is an extinct genus of early dugong from the Early Miocene (Aquitanian) Libano Formation in northern Italy.

Classification
It was originally classified as a species of Halitherium, H. bellunense, but was eventually recognized as closer to the dugong than to Halitherium schinzii, necessitating erection of the new generic name Italosiren.

See also 
 Evolution of sirenians

References 

Miocene sirenians
Prehistoric placental genera
Aquitanian (stage)
Miocene mammals of Europe
Neogene Italy
Fossils of Italy
Fossil taxa described in 2017